A rapid response team (RRT), also known as a medical emergency team (MET) and high acuity response team (HART), is a team of health care providers that responds to hospitalized patients with early signs of deterioration on non-intensive care units to prevent respiratory or cardiac arrest. The health care providers are trained in early resuscitation interventions and advanced life support and may include a physician, nurse, pharmacist, or respiratory therapist. The RRT, medical emergency team (MET), critical care outreach team (CCOT), and rover team are all different forms of the outgoing component of the rapid response system. The team responds to calls placed by clinicians or families at the bedside who have detected deterioration. Some teams may also provide care during transport between hospitals, acting as a critical care transport team.

Effectiveness
Rapid response teams appear to decrease the rates of respiratory and cardiac arrest outside the intensive care unit. They also appear to decrease the chance of death in hospital. Overall effectiveness of RRTs is somewhat controversial due to the variability across studies.

See also
 Quick response team (disambiguation)

References

Critical emergency medicine
Emergency medical responders